The Greatest Gift was a US TV daytime soap opera on NBC that ran between 1954 and 1955, featuring Ward Costello, Anne Meara and Jack Klugman as Jim Hanson. Dr. Eve Allen, played by Anne Burr, was one of the first TV women doctors. One of the last storylines before cancellation was a couple adopting a black-market baby.

Cast
The cast included:
 Anne Burr: Eve Allen
 Philip Foster: Phil Stone
 Athena Lorde: Betty Matthews
 Will Hare: Harold Matthews (1954–1955)
 Martin Balsam: Harold Matthews (1955)
 Gene Peterson: Ned Blackman (1954–1955)
 Ward Costello: Ned Blackman (1955)
 Jack Klugman: Jim Hanson
 Josef Drake: Sam Blake
 Henry Barnard: Peter Blake
 Helen Warren: Mrs. Blake
 Margaret Heneghan: Peg
 Anne Meara: Harriet (1954–1955)

References

External links
Internet Movie Database

American television soap operas
1954 American television series debuts
1955 American television series endings